"All My Loving" is a 1963 song by English rock band The Beatles.

All My Loving may also refer to:
 All My Loving (EP), a 1964 EP by the Beatles
 "All My Loving"/"Koibito", a 1993 song by Masaharu Fukuyama
 All My Loving (film), a 2019 German drama film
 All My Loving, a 1968 TV documentary by Tony Palmer
 "All My Loving", a 2022 song by Sam Fischer

See also 
 All My Love (disambiguation)